Sovietwave (also styled Soviet wave or Soviet-wave) is a subgenre of synthwave music and an online aesthetic which originates from a number of post-Soviet states, primarily Russia. It is characterized by themes emphasizing the technology and development of the Soviet Union (such as the Soviet space program and retrofuturistic Soviet era architecture and art) and is part of the cultural phenomenon of nostalgia for the Soviet Union. Linguist Maria Engström described the subgenre as the post-Soviet counterpart to vaporwave, evoking a similar nostalgic critique of the "contemporary collapse of futurity", and the longing for the lost optimism of a bygone era.

History 
The first attempts to bring Soviet nostalgia to modern music began in the 2000s, when trance music was at the peak of its popularity. Trance music duo PPK used the melodies of Soviet electronic music as the basis of their compositions. "Electrosound nostalgia" appeared in the mid-2010s, which is when the genre started to become more well defined. The main inspirations for composers of Sovietwave are often the emotions and collective cultural memories associated with the Soviet Union during the 1980s. Lyudmila Shevchenko, a scholar from the Jan Kochanowski University, notes that the genre is one of the manifestations of the "nostalgic myth", a "vivid, sensual and lively" mythical image based on the recent past. Sovietwave became popular in most post-Soviet countries in the second half of the 2010s. It is related to the global proliferation of the synthwave genre, and the phenomenon of nostalgia for 1980s Soviet culture in the former Soviet republics.

During the COVID-19 pandemic, Sovietwave experienced a growth in popularity, along with other subgenres of vaporwave, synthwave, and, to a lesser extent, doomer music. This upsurge was driven, in large part, by the success of the Belarusian post-punk band Molchat Doma on the social media platform, TikTok, where the group's song Судно (Борис Рыжий) from the album Etazhi became a popular meme which, according to Cat Zhang of Pitchfork connects with Generation-Z's "deep pessimism towards the future". As lockdowns continued across the Western world, Molchat Doma's propulsion of Sovietwave into the mainstream spawned multiple compilations of the genre on music streaming websites, such as Spotify and YouTube, which feature more overt nostalgia for Soviet and space age aesthetics, despite the Belarusian group's criticism of the genre for "fail[ing] to recognize the harsh realities of life in the region".

Style 

Sovietwave is based on modern electronic music trends such as lo-fi, ambient and synth-pop, as well as the electronic music of the late Soviet Union. Despite Sovietwave's widespread use of sampling from radio programs and speeches, the genre is not overtly political. Sovietwave music is characterized by an emphasis on the cultural, political and scientific aspects of Soviet life, with excerpts from educational films and speeches by Soviet statesmen being used primarily to create a nostalgic experience for the listener. Sovietwave usually includes themes about space and technological progress which disappeared with the collapse of the Soviet space program, together with positive childhood reminiscences and utopic, philanthropic hopes of the Space Age. The genre is one of several expressions of Soviet nostalgia in the modern cultural space which value the Soviet past for its futuristic speculations.

The genre is influenced by the music of old Soviet films and cartoons, such as The Mystery of the Third Planet, Guest from the Future, The Adventures of the Elektronic, Courier, Leopold the Cat, Moscow-Cassiopeia, Office Romance, One Hundred Days After Childhood, Three from Prostokvashino, comedies of Leonid Gaidai, old episodes of Yeralash, and others. Common influences of the genre are soviet composers Eduard Artemyev, Aleksandr Zatsepin and music groups Zodiac, Alliance, Forum, Mayak, and New Collection. However, the genre is also influenced by the work of western artists popular in the USSR, such as Depeche Mode, Digital Emotion, Modern Talking.

See also
Soyuzmultfilm
Hardvapour
Hauntology
Nostalgia for the Soviet Union

References

External links
 The Guardian: Russia's musical new wave embraces Soviet chic
History & Culture Academy of Latgale The Nostalgic Phenom of the Sovietwave Music
 Peek-a-boo music magazine SOVIETWAVE. Cosmonauts' day special
 Internet radio station «Советская волна», 24-hour broadcasting music in the genre sovietwave.
 Soviet Nostalgia Now Has Its Own Soundtrack. Jacobin. 19 February 2022.

2010s in music
Nostalgia for the Soviet Union
Retro style
Russian music
Synthwave
2010s neologisms